Kilamullakudy  is a village in Tiruchirappalli taluk of Tiruchirappalli district in Tamil Nadu, India.

Demographics 

As per the 2001 census, Kilamullakudy had a population of 1,829 with 920 males and 909 females. The sex ratio was 988 and the literacy rate, 82.41.

References 

 

Villages in Tiruchirappalli district